Jolynn Boster (born March 21, 1951) is a former member of the Ohio House of Representatives. She was the second woman ever elected to serve Gallia County in the Ohio General Assembly. From 1978-1980 she was an assistant Gallipolis city solicitor and she then served four consecutive terms as a state representative. During her service, she continued to work at the law firm Cowles & Boster C., LPA.

Education 
Boster received both her Bachelor of Science (1973) and Juris Doctor (1976) from Ohio State University.

Awards 
In 1983, she received the Gallipolis Business and Professional Women's Club Woman of the Year award; Boster was also the recipient of the Ohio Association of County Boards of MR/DD Legislator of the Year and the Leadership Award from the Ohio Developmental Disabilities Planning Council.

External links
Profile on the Ohio Ladies' Gallery website

References

Members of the Ohio House of Representatives
Women state legislators in Ohio
Living people
20th-century American politicians
20th-century American women politicians
1951 births
Clubwomen
21st-century American women